The 1895–96 British Home Championship was an edition of the annual international football tournament played between the British Home Nations. Despite England achieving an almost record 9–1 victory over Wales, the trophy was won by Scotland who won two and drew one of their matches, the draw coming in a hard-fought duel with Ireland.

Wales and Ireland kicked off the tournament with the Welsh heavily defeating the Irish in Wrexham. England too beat the Irish in their opening game, although by a smaller scoreline and England then achieved their 9–1 victory over Wales with Steve Bloomer scoring five, an England record. Scotland too beat Wales, scoring four without reply before being held by the Irish in an exciting and close match.

In the final game at Celtic Park, England and Scotland played for the trophy, England only needing a draw whilst the Scots required a win to take the tournament. To improve their chances, Scotland decided to select England-based players for the first time, holding a selection trial between their 'Home' and 'Anglo' players which became an annual event for the next 30 years. In a close and dramatic game, Scotland narrowly beat the English 2–1 and won the championship. The decisive Scotland v England match, watched by a crowd of 60,000, generated receipts of £3,640, a world record at the time for a football match.

Table

Results

Winning squad

Notes

References

British
Home
Home
British Home Championships
Brit
Brit
Brit